Ernest Edward Austen DSO (1867 in London – 16 January 1938) was an English entomologist specialising in Diptera and Hymenoptera.

His collection of Amazonian and Sierra Leonian insects is in the Natural History Museum, London.

He wrote Illustrations of British Blood-Sucking Flies (1906) illustrated by Amedeo John Engel Terzi.

Austen was a frequent correspondent of Ethel Katharine Pearce, dipterologist, daughter of Thomas and granddaughter of Charles Henry Blake.

Patronymic taxa
Taxa named for Austen include:
 Glossina austeni

References
Blair, K. G. 1938: [Austen, E. E.] Entomologist's Monthly Magazine (3) 74 42-43 Obit.

External links

Internet Archive Report of the Malaria Expedition of the Liverpool School of Tropical Medicine (1902)
Internet Archive Illustrations of British Blood-Sucking Flies (1906)
Internet Archive Illustrations of African blood-sucking flies other than mosquitoes and tsetse-flies (1909)
Hathi Trust Link A Handbook of the Tsetse-Files (1909)

Entomologists from London
Hymenopterists
Dipterists
1867 births
1938 deaths
Companions of the Distinguished Service Order